"Put Your Phone Down (Low)" is a song produced and recorded by David Guetta under the alias Jack Back, released as a single on 1 March 2019. The single became Guetta's thirteenth number one (and his third under the Jack Back alias) on Billboards Dance Club Songs chart, reaching the summit in its 18 May 2019 issue.

Track listing

Charts

Weekly charts

Year-end charts

See also
 List of number-one dance singles of 2019 (U.S.)

References

External links
Official Video at YouTube

2019 singles
2019 songs
David Guetta songs
Songs written by David Guetta
Song recordings produced by David Guetta